Phyllis "Bobbie" Cryner (born September 13, 1961) is an American country singer-songwriter. She released her debut album, the bluesy Bobbie Cryner, in 1993 on Epic Records. The album featured six original Cryner songs, as well as four songs by outside writers, including a duet with Dwight Yoakam on the Buck Owens cover "I Don't Care." The album charted three singles on the Billboard Hot Country Singles & Tracks chart, including "Daddy Laid the Blues On Me," No. 63 on July 31, 1993; "He Feels Guilty," No. 68 on December 11, 1993; and "You Could Steal Me," No. 72 on May 28, 1994.

Cryner left Epic Records for MCA Records to record her second album, Girl of Your Dreams. The album was produced by Tony Brown, head of MCA Records. The second album featured a more straight-ahead, contemporary country. As with the first, Cryner wrote five of the songs on the album, with the other five coming from outside songwriters, including her cover of "Son of a Preacher Man". The album was heralded by the first single and video, "I Just Can't Stand To Be Unhappy," which was written by noted songwriter Hugh Prestwood and entered the country charts on October 14, 1995. It peaked at No. 63 on the Hot Country Singles & Tracks. The second single and video, "You'd Think He'd Know Me Better," entered the charts on March 2, 1996, and peaked at No. 56. A third single and video, Cryner's autobiographical "I Didn't Know My Own Strength," was released in late summer 1996. Cryner left MCA in 1997.

Cryner continued writing songs for other artists, including Trisha Yearwood's "Real Live Woman" (#16), Suzy Bogguss' "Nobody Love, Nobody Gets Hurt" (#63), and Lee Ann Womack's "Stronger Than I Am."

Bobbie Cryner appeared briefly in the 1995 film Something to Talk About starring Julia Roberts, Dennis Quaid, and Robert Duvall.

Discography

Albums

Singles

Music videos

References

1961 births
Living people
Singer-songwriters from California
People from Woodland, California
Place of birth missing (living people)
Epic Records artists
MCA Records artists
American women country singers
American country singer-songwriters
Country musicians from California
21st-century American women